Glenda Dorothy Randerson (born 1949) is a New Zealand painter. Her art is held in the permanent collection of Auckland Art Gallery Toi o Tāmaki.

Life 
Randerson studied at the Elam School of Fine Arts in Auckland under Colin McCahon and began exhibiting in 1975. Her early paintings were still-lifes and domestic interiors, although later in her career she also painted figures. In the 1990s Randerson completed a series of portraits of New Zealand writers, including Joy Cowley and Stevan Eldred-Grigg.

She is the wife of former Court of Appeal judge Tony Randerson.

References

1949 births
Living people
20th-century New Zealand painters
20th-century New Zealand women artists
21st-century New Zealand women artists
Elam Art School alumni